Uslu is a village in the Sivrice District of Elazığ Province in Turkey. The village is populated by Kurds and Muhacir Turks and had a population of 103 in 2021.

The hamlet of Yenice is attached to the village.

References

Villages in Sivrice District
Kurdish settlements in Elazığ Province